{{Speciesbox
| image = Ctenophorus fordi 55455520.jpg
| status = LC
| status_system = IUCN3.1
| status_ref = 
| genus = Ctenophorus
| species = fordi
| authority = (Storr, 1965)
| synonyms = *Amphibolurus fordi 
Phthanodon fordi 
Phthanodon hawkeswoodi 
| synonyms_ref = 
| range_map = Ctenophorus_fordi_distribution_2021_update.png
| range_map_caption = Distribution of Ctenophorus fordi}}

The Mallee military dragon (Ctenophorus fordi), also commonly known as the Mallee dragon or Mallee sand-dragon, is a species of agamid lizard occurring in the arid parts of southern Australia. The Mallee military dragon's specific name, fordi was named after Dr. Julian Ralph Ford (1932-1987). Dr. Ford was an ornithologist, herpetologist and chemist who worked at the Western Australian Museum. He collected the lizard holotype and many of the paratypes.

DescriptionCtenophorus fordi is a small endemic Australian lizard that grows to a maximum size of 5cm snout-vent length.  C. fordi display a dark reddish-orange colouration with a pale dorso-lateral stripe extending from the posterior region of the neck to the anterior portion of the tail. The pale stripe is bordered by a thin, black strip. The dark orange-brown region enclosed by the pale stripe is flecked with small pale spots.

Distribution
It is commonly found in south-eastern Western Australia, through central South Australia, and into the north-west corner of New South Wales and south-west corner of Queensland. What were previously considered to be populations occurring in south-east South Australia, western Victoria and central New South Wales, were reclassified in 2019 as a separate species; the Eastern Mallee dragon.

Ecology and behaviour
The main habitat type for Mallee military dragons include shrubs and hummock grass. The Mallee dragon lives in sandy arid to semi-arid areas of Mallee woodland and spinifex, as well as vegetated sand dunes. They prefer areas of Mallee that haven't been burnt for around 30 years, when spinifex cover is at its maximum. 

Mallee military dragons emerge from dormancy in August, males appear about four weeks earlier than females. Active even on very hot days, they forage in sandy, open areas, and will dash for cover into nearby grasses or low bushes if disturbed or pursued. Males are territorial.

The signaling behaviour of C. fordi is composed almost exclusively of head bobs, which both males and females produce when they encounter another individual 

Diet
The Mallee military dragon's diet largely consists of ants 

Reproduction
The Mallee military dragon reproduces sexually, with an oviparous and dioecious reproduction method. Mating occurs in spring. Females produces sequential clutches of two to five eggs over the reproductive season and the offspring hatch from December to March.
Males are not territorial and there has been no evidence of male-male aggression.

Conservation actions
The species is listed under the IUCN Red List of Threatened Species as a species of 'Least concern'.
The Mallee military dragon occurs in several protected areas, including the Sturt National Park in New South Wales, and the Currawinya National Park in Queensland.

Threats
The Mallee military dragon is vulnerable to various threats. These include:
 Habitat loss from land clearing, degradation by introduced species such as cattle and rabbits, and modification caused by climate change
 Death on roads
 Predation by introduced species such as dogs, cats, pigs, and foxes
 Threats from emerging diseases

References

Further reading
Sadlier, R.A., Shea, G.M. (1989). "The reptiles of Mungo National Park and the Willandra Lakes region". Herpetofauna'', 19(2), pp. 9–27.

Agamid lizards of Australia
Reptiles described in 1965
fordi
Endemic fauna of Australia
Taxa named by Glen Milton Storr